"Mending Fences" is a song written by Jim Robinson and Andy Byrd, and recorded by American country music group Restless Heart. It was released in January 1993 as the second single from the album Big Iron Horses.  The song reached number 13 on the Billboard Hot Country Singles & Tracks chart and peaked at number 3 on the Canadian RPM Country Tracks chart. Bassist Paul Gregg sings lead vocals on this song.

Music video
The music video was directed by Michael Merriman and premiered in early 1993.

Chart performance
"Mending Fences" debuted at number 66 on the U.S. Billboard Hot Country Singles & Tracks for the week of January 23, 1993.

Year-end charts

References

1993 singles
Restless Heart songs
Song recordings produced by Josh Leo
RCA Records Nashville singles
1992 songs